Cammaerts is a surname. Notable people with the surname include:

Edwig Cammaerts (born 1987), Belgian cyclist
Émile Cammaerts (1878–1953), Belgian playwright, poet, and author
Francis Cammaerts (1916–2006), British special agent, son of Émile

Surnames of Belgian origin